Cajsa Stina (CajsaStina) Åkerström, (born 16 August 1967) is a Swedish singer-songwriter, painter and author. She is the daughter of singer Fred Åkerström.

Her debut album was released by Warner Music in 1994. Åkerström has since released three more albums at Warner Music. She then started her own Calimba Records label in 2004 and has since released her forthcoming albums with different distributors. 

Åkerström participated in Melodifestivalen 2014 in the third semi-final1 with the entry "En enkel sång" (A simple song).

She published her first novel, Du och jag farsan, in 2010.

The Covid-19 pandemic rearranged the agenda for Åkerström. She now focused on a fantasy since childhood: to really try out on a possible other aspect to artistry, painting.

In June 2021, she had a first exhibition in her southeastern Sweden hometown Kalmar. The reaction was overwhelming, she sold all her first works and received all over positive reviews and media reactions both locally and domestically, including national TV.

References

External links
Official website

1967 births
Living people
21st-century Swedish singers
21st-century Swedish women singers
Melodifestivalen contestants of 2014